Okan Buruk (born 19 October 1973) is a Turkish professional football manager and former player.  He is currently the manager of Süper Lig club Galatasaray. As a former midfielder, he played for Galatasaray, Inter Milan, Beşiktaş, and İstanbul B.B. He was capped 56 times for the Turkey national team.

Club career
Okan Buruk played for Turkish giants Galatasaray between 1991 and 2001, winning six Turkish Süper Lig titles and the 1999–2000 UEFA Cup. He was also named man of the match as Galatasary upset Real Madrid 2–1 to win the 2000 UEFA Super Cup.

Inter Milan
In 2001, he was signed by Italian Serie A club Inter Milan along with his teammate Emre, where he played for three years. On August 26, 2001, Okan made his debut against Perugia coming in as a substitute for Seedorf. He made his first Champions League appearance for Inter in a home game win against Ajax on September 25, 2002.

On October 21, 2001, in the derby game against Terim's Milan, Okan made the assist to Kallon where Inter lost their home game 4–2 against their rivals.

Okan scored his first goal on the 89th minute helping his team to earn a 2–2 draw in an away game against Roma on November 16, 2002. 
Okan was a non-stop running player with energy; he mentioned that his former coach Cuper yelled at him from the bench that he should stay at his position.

Besiktas
He played two seasons for Beşiktaş and he won the Turkish Cup in 2006.

Return to Galatasaray
In July 2006,  Okan made his return to his former club Galatasaray by signing a two-year contract. After becoming Süper Lig winners in 2007–08 season his contract was not extended and Okan left the club.

İstanbul Başakşehir
After his contract expired with Galatasaray, Okan joined İstanbul B.B. in July 2008 for a two year deal.

Retirement
On May 22, 2010, he retired as a player after a friendly game against Czech Republic in Leipzig.

International career
Okan made 56 appearances for the Turkey national team, representing the country at UEFA Euro 2000 and the 2002 FIFA World Cup. He scored Turkey's first ever Euro goal, the equaliser of Euro 2000 in a 2–1 loss to Italy in Arnhem. 
Okan was also part of the 2002 FIFA World Cup squad, but due to an injury he made his only appearance as a substitute in the 3–2 win against host nation South Korea in the third-place play-off.

Managerial career
After his playing career, Okan became a professional manager. On 10 May 2018, he guided Akhisarspor to their second trophy in their history, the 2017–18 Turkish Cup.

After Akhisarspor, he managed Çaykur Rizespor from 2018 until 2019, before becoming the new manager of İstanbul Başakşehir on 11 June 2019. In his first season in charge, Buruk guided the club to their first ever league title.

In early 2021, he left İstanbul Başakşehir on "mutual agreement" after a string of poor results by the club under his management in the 2020–21 Süper Lig season.

Galatasaray
On 23 June 2022, Okan was appointed as coach of his former club Galatasaray. He won 14 consecutive games in a row and broke the club record.

Personal life
He is originally from Akçaabat, Trabzon. He married model and former Miss Turkey and Top Model of the World 2003 winner Nihan Akkuş on 3 July 2007. His brother, Fuat, was also a professional footballer and currently a coach.

Career statistics

Club
Source:

International
Source:

Managerial

Honours

Player
Galatasaray
UEFA Super Cup: 2000
UEFA Cup: 1999–2000
Süper Lig: 1992–93, 1993–94, 1996–97, 1997–98, 1998–99, 1999–2000, 2007–08
Turkish Cup: 1992–93, 1995–96, 1998–99, 1999–2000
Turkish Super Cup: 1992–93, 1995–96, 1996–97

Beşiktaş
Turkish Cup: 2005–06
Turkish Super Cup: 2006–07

Turkey
FIFA World Cup 3rd place: 2002

Manager
Akhisarspor
Turkish Cup: 2017–18

İstanbul Başakşehir
Süper Lig: 2019–20

Individual
 Man of the Match: 2000 UEFA Super Cup

References

External links

1973 births
Beşiktaş J.K. footballers
Living people
Turkish footballers
Association football midfielders
Galatasaray S.K. footballers
Inter Milan players
Serie A players
Turkey international footballers
Turkey under-21 international footballers
Expatriate footballers in Italy
Turkish expatriate sportspeople in Italy
Turkish expatriate footballers
UEFA Euro 2000 players
2002 FIFA World Cup players
İstanbul Başakşehir F.K. players
Süper Lig players
Turkey youth international footballers
Turkish football managers
Süper Lig managers
Elazığspor managers
Gaziantepspor managers
Sivasspor managers
Göztepe S.K. managers
Akhisarspor managers
İstanbul Başakşehir F.K. managers
UEFA Cup winning players
Galatasaray S.K. (football) managers